Lleyton Hewitt defeated defending champion Thomas Enqvist 3–6, 6–3, 6–2, in a repeat of the previous year's final, to secure the title.

Seeds

  Thomas Enqvist (final)
  Tim Henman (quarterfinals)
  Magnus Norman (semifinals)
  Dominik Hrbatý (first round)
  Vincent Spadea (first round)
  Lleyton Hewitt (champion)
  Sébastien Grosjean (quarterfinals)
  Nicolas Escudé (semifinals)

Draw

Finals

Section 1

Section 2

External links
2000 Next Generation Adelaide International Draw

Singles